The Arboretum de Saint-Avaugourd-des-Landes is an arboretum located in Saint-Avaugourd-des-Landes, Vendée, Pays de la Loire, France.

See also 
 List of botanical gardens in France

References

External links
 Vendée Tourisme description (French)
 L'Echo des Chênaies entry (French)

Saint-Avaugourd-des-Landes, Arboretum de
Saint-Avaugourd-des-Landes, Arboretum de